Jacques Willy Kouassi (born 29 December 1991) is an Ivorian professional basketball player for Dalia Sportive de Grombalia and the Ivorian national team.

He represented the Ivory Coast at the FIBA AfroBasket 2021, where the team won the silver medal.

References

External links

Arkansas Razorbacks bio

1991 births
Living people
Arkansas Razorbacks men's basketball players
Auburn Tigers men's basketball players
Centers (basketball)
Dalia Sportive de Grombalia players
Ivorian expatriate basketball people in the United States
Ivorian expatriate basketball people in France
Ivorian expatriate sportspeople in Oman
Ivorian expatriate sportspeople in Tunisia
Ivorian men's basketball players
Kennesaw State Owls men's basketball players
Sportspeople from Abidjan